Bilo-bilo is a Filipino dessert made of small glutinous balls (sticky rice flour rounded up by adding water) in coconut milk and sugar. Then jackfruit, saba bananas, various tubers, and tapioca pearls are added. Bilo bilo's origin is in Luzon (Tuguegarao City, Cagayan), which is the northern Philippines Island. There are different recipe versions depending what region in the Philippines it is from. Some recipes call for young coconut meat and some call for adding pandan leaves. This is usually and traditionally eaten hot while others prefer eating them after refrigeration.

Preparation 
To prepare bilo-bilo (rice balls), mix rice flour with water in a bowl and form them later into small balls, about 1/2 in. diameter. Then, drop each ball in a boiling water; cook until they float. For the tapioca balls, boil them until soft and translucent, then drain. Mix and boil coconut milk and water, then add sweet potatoes, the tapioca, sugar and the cooked bilo-bilo. For more taste, add cooked and tender jackfruit strips and banana rounds.

See also
 Halo-halo
Sago pudding

References

Philippine desserts
Rice dishes
Vegetarian dishes of the Philippines